Grass wattle is a common name for several plants and may refer to:

Acacia anomala, a shrub native to the west coast of Western Australia
Acacia willdenowiana, a shrub native to the south west of Western Australia